The Antigua and Barbuda women's national volleyball team represents Antigua and Barbuda in international volleyball competitions.

References
NORCECA
2010 World Championship Qualifier

Volleyball
National women's volleyball teams
Women's sport in Antigua and Barbuda